Clinton James Hall (October 3, 1926 – September 12, 1984) was an American lawyer and politician.

Hall was born in Carrington, Foster County, North Dakota and went to the Carrington Public Elementary and High Schools. He graduated from University of Minnesota in 1950 and received his law degree from the St. Paul College of Law (now William Mitchell College of Law). Hall served in the Minnesota National Guard during the Korean War. Hall lived in Rushford, Fillmore County, Minnesota with his wife and family and practiced law in Rushford. Hall served in the Minnesota House of Representatives from 1961 to 1968 and was a Republican. He died in San Diego, California from heart problems.

References

1926 births
1984 deaths
People from Foster County, North Dakota
People from Rushford, Minnesota
Minnesota National Guard personnel
Minnesota lawyers
University of Minnesota alumni
William Mitchell College of Law alumni
Republican Party members of the Minnesota House of Representatives